Joseph Mercer may refer to:

 Joe Mercer (1914–1990), English football player and manager
 Joe Mercer (footballer, born 1889) (1889–1927), his father, English football centre half
 Joe Mercer (jockey) (1934–2021), English jockey
 Joseph Wayne Mercer (1845–1906), American politician in Missouri